These 372 species belong to Psychoda, a genus of moth flies in the family Psychodidae.

Psychoda species

Psychoda ablucens Quate & Quate, 1967 c g
Psychoda absidata Quate & Quate, 1967 c g
Psychoda acanthostyla Tokunaga, 1957 c g
Psychoda aculeata Quate, 1996 c g
Psychoda acuta Tonnoir, 1939 c g
Psychoda acutilamina Quate, 1959 c g
Psychoda acutipennis Tonnoir, 1920 c g
Psychoda aderces Quate, 1962 c g
Psychoda adumbrata Satchell, 1953 c g
Psychoda adunca Wagner & Andersen, 2007 c g
Psychoda adyscheres Quate, 1959 c g
Psychoda aitkeni Quate, 1959 c g
Psychoda alabangensis Rosario, 1936 c g
Psychoda albescens Quate & Quate, 1967 c g
Psychoda albida Tonnoir, 1939 c g
Psychoda albidonigra Tonnoir, 1939 c g
Psychoda albipennis Zetterstedt, 1850 c g
Psychoda albopicta Brunetti, 1911 c g
Psychoda alia Quate, 1962 c g
Psychoda allodapa Quate, 1959 c g
Psychoda alternata Say, 1824 i c g b
Psychoda alternicula Quate, 1955 i c g
Psychoda alticola Vaillant, 1973 c g
Psychoda alveata Quate & Quate, 1967 c g
Psychoda amazonensis Cordeiro, 2008 c g
Psychoda amphorica Tonnoir, 1939 c g
Psychoda angustipennis (Williston, 1896) c g
Psychoda angustisternata Satchell, 1955 c g
Psychoda annectans Quate & Quate, 1967 c g
Psychoda antennalis (Williston, 1896) c g
Psychoda apennata Satchell, 1953 c g
Psychoda apicalis Brunetti, 1911 c g
Psychoda aponensos Quate, 1959 c g
Psychoda apparitia Quate, 1996 c g
Psychoda arcuata Satchell, 1953 c g
Psychoda armillariphila Vaillant, 1988 c g
Psychoda articaula Quate, 1996 c g
Psychoda articuliga Quate, 1965 c g
Psychoda atraseta (Rapp, 1945) c g
Psychoda balaenica Quate, 1996 c g
Psychoda barbigera Quate & Quate, 1967 c g
Psychoda bicordata Quate, 1996 c g
Psychoda bidigitalis Quate, 1965 c g
Psychoda bilobata Tonnoir, 1939 c g
Psychoda biretinaculata Wagner, 1978 c g
Psychoda bisacula Quate, 1996 c g
Psychoda bitrunculens Quate & Quate, 1967 c g
Psychoda blandita Quate & Quate, 1967 c g
Psychoda boettgeri Wagner, 1979 c g
Psychoda bogotensis Wagner & Joost, 1994 c g
Psychoda bojata Quate & Quate, 1967 c g
Psychoda brachyptera Quate, 1964 c g
Psychoda brassi Quate & Quate, 1967 c g
Psychoda brevicerca Huang & Chen, 1992 c g
Psychoda brevicornis Tonnoir, 1940 c g
Psychoda bulbosa Jezek, 2005 c g
Psychoda buxoides Quate, 1996 c g
Psychoda buxtoni Withers, 1988 c g
Psychoda byblis Quate, 1962 c g
Psychoda calva Satchell, 1955 c g
Psychoda campbellica Quate, 1964 c g
Psychoda canalis Quate, 1999 c g
Psychoda canlaones Quate, 1965 c g
Psychoda capitipenis Ibanez-Bernal, 1991 c g
Psychoda caudata Quate, 1962 c g
Psychoda celebris Quate, 1962 c g
Psychoda cetreta Quate & Quate, 1967 c g
Psychoda cinerea Banks, 1894 i c g
Psychoda cochlearia Satchell, 1950 c g
Psychoda collina Quate, 1965 c g
Psychoda concinna Quate & Quate, 1967 c g
Psychoda congruens Satchell, 1955 c g
Psychoda consobrina Satchell, 1955 c g
Psychoda contortula Satchell, 1955 c g
Psychoda coprophila Vaillant, 1988 g
Psychoda cordiforma Quate, 1996 c g
Psychoda crassipennis Tonnoir, 1940 c g
Psychoda crenula Quate, 1962 c g
Psychoda cristata Duckhouse, 1966 c g
Psychoda cristula Quate, 1965 c g
Psychoda cultella Salmela, Kvifte & More, 2012 g
Psychoda cylindrica Wagner, 1989 c g
Psychoda dantilandensis Bravo, Cordeiro & Chagas, 2006 c g
Psychoda debilis Quate & Quate, 1967 c g
Psychoda degenera Walker, 1848 i c g
Psychoda delicata Quate, 1965 c g
Psychoda dennesi Satchell, 1953 c g
Psychoda dentata Tonnoir, 1939 c g
Psychoda despicata Wagner, 1978 c g
Psychoda deviata Tonnoir, 1939 c g
Psychoda dewulfi Satchell, 1955 c g
Psychoda disacca Duckhouse, 1966 c g
Psychoda dissidens Quate & Quate, 1967 c g
Psychoda divaricata Duckhouse, 1968 c g
Psychoda dolomitica Salamanna & Sara, 1980 c g
Psychoda domestica Haseman, 1908 i c g
Psychoda duaspica Quate & Quate, 1967 c g
Psychoda dubia (Bigot, 1888) c g
Psychoda duplilamnata Tokunaga, 1957 c g
Psychoda eburna (Rapp, 1945) c g
Psychoda echinata Quate & Quate, 1967 c g
Psychoda elegans Kincaid, 1897 i c g
Psychoda entolopha Quate, 1996 c g
Psychoda eremita Quate, 1964 c g
Psychoda erminea Eaton, 1894 c g
Psychoda erratilis Quate & Quate, 1967 c g
Psychoda esakii Tokunaga, 1958 c g
Psychoda euboana Vaillant, 1988 g
Psychoda exigua Quate & Quate, 1967 c g
Psychoda exilis Quate & Quate, 1967 c g
Psychoda fasciata Quate, 1965 c g
Psychoda felina Quate, 1965 c g
Psychoda filipenis Satchell, 1955 c g
Psychoda fimbriatissima (Blanchard, 1852) c g
Psychoda flagellata Quate, 1996 c g
Psychoda flava Edwards, 1927 c g
Psychoda flexichela Quate, 1965 c g
Psychoda flexistyla Satchell, 1955 c g
Psychoda floropsis Quate & Quate, 1967 c g
Psychoda floscula Quate, 1962 c g
Psychoda fo-no Tokunaga, 1957 g
Psychoda formosa Satchell, 1954 c g
Psychoda formosana Tokunaga, 1957 c g
Psychoda formosensis Tokunaga, 1957 g
Psychoda formosiensis Tokunaga, 1957 c g
Psychoda frivola Quate, 1965 c g
Psychoda fucastra Quate, 1962 c g
Psychoda fucosa Quate, 1962 c g
Psychoda fulvohirta Brunetti, 1911 c g
Psychoda fumetaria Vaillant, 1988 g
Psychoda fungicola Tokunaga, 1953 c g
Psychoda furcillata Quate & Quate, 1967 c g
Psychoda fusticola Quate, 1965 c g
Psychoda gehrkeae Quate, 1959 c g
Psychoda gemella Quate & Quate, 1967 c g
Psychoda gemina (Eaton, 1904) c g
Psychoda geniculata Brunetti, 1911 c g
Psychoda gilvipes Brunetti, 1908 c g
Psychoda gracicaulis Quate & Quate, 1967 c g
Psychoda gracilipenis Duckhouse, 1966 c g
Psychoda gressitti Quate, 1959 c g
Psychoda grisescens Tonnoir, 1922 c g
Psychoda guamensis Quate, 1959 c g
Psychoda guianica (Curran, 1934) c g
Psychoda hamatospicula Satchell, 1955 c g
Psychoda harrisi Satchell, 1950 i c g
Psychoda hastata Quate & Quate, 1967 c g
Psychoda helotes Quate, 1962 c g
Psychoda hemicorcula Quate, 1959 c g
Psychoda hespersa Quate, 1959 c g
Psychoda hyalinata (Blanchard, 1852) c g
Psychoda imounctata Brunetti, 1911 c g
Psychoda inaequalis Satchell, 1950 c g
Psychoda incompta Quate, 1996 c g
Psychoda indica Vaillant, 1965 c g
Psychoda innotabilis Quate, 1962 c g
Psychoda inornata Grimshaw, 1901 i c g
Psychoda itoco Tokunaga & Komyo, 1955 c g
Psychoda jezeki Withers, 1988 c g
Psychoda jp-no Tokunaga, 1958 g
Psychoda jucunda Quate, 1962 c g
Psychoda juliae Wagner & Masteller, 1996 c g
Psychoda kalabanica Quate, 1962 c g
Psychoda kea Quate, 1962 c g
Psychoda lamina Quate & Quate, 1967 c g
Psychoda laticaula Quate, 1996 c g
Psychoda laticeps Quate, 1996 c g
Psychoda latipennis Tonnoir, 1939 c g
Psychoda latisternata Tonnoir, 1939 c g
Psychoda lativentris Berden, 1952 i
Psychoda lebanica Vaillant & Moubayed, 1987 c g
Psychoda limicola Vaillant, 1973 i c g
Psychoda litotes Quate, 1996 c g
Psychoda lloydi Satchell, 1950 c g
Psychoda lobata Tonnoir, 1940 c g
Psychoda longifringa Haseman, 1907 i c g
Psychoda longiseta Tokunaga & Komyo, 1955 c g
Psychoda longivirga Huang & Chen, 1992 c g
Psychoda lucubrans Quate, 1959 c g
Psychoda lusca Quate, 1965 c g
Psychoda lusitanica Vaillant & Terra, 1987 g
Psychoda lutea Quate, 1962 c g
Psychoda luzonica Quate, 1965 c g
Psychoda macispina Quate & Quate, 1967 c g
Psychoda maculipennis Brunetti, 1911 c g
Psychoda maculosa (Rapp, 1945) c g
Psychoda magna Vaillant, 1965 c g
Psychoda magnipalpus Quate, 1960 c g
Psychoda makati Rosario, 1936 c g
Psychoda malayica Quate, 1962 c g
Psychoda malickyi Vaillant, 1988 g
Psychoda malleola Tokunaga & Komyo, 1954 c g
Psychoda malleopenis Satchell, 1953 c g
Psychoda martini Hogue, 1970 c g
Psychoda mastierrensis Satchell, 1952 c g
Psychoda maxima Tonnoir, 1939 c g
Psychoda mediocris Quate, 1959 c g
Psychoda megale Quate, 1957 c g
Psychoda meyi Wagner, 2003 c g
Psychoda mimica Quate, 1996 c g
Psychoda minuta Banks, 1894 i c g
Psychoda minutissima (Enderlein, 1938) c g
Psychoda mirabilis Quate & Quate, 1967 c g
Psychoda miyatakei Tokunaga, 1958 c g
Psychoda modesta Tonnoir, 1939 c g
Psychoda moleva Quate, 1965 c g
Psychoda montana Wagner, 2000 c g
Psychoda monticola Quate & Quate, 1967 c g
Psychoda moravica Vaillant, 1966 c g
Psychoda morogorica Wagner & Andersen, 2007 c g
Psychoda motoharui Tokunaga & Komyo, 1955 c g
Psychoda mundula Duckhouse, 1966 c g
Psychoda musae Rosario, 1936 c g
Psychoda muscicola Vaillant, 1963 c g
Psychoda mycophila Vaillant, 1988 c g
Psychoda neoformosana Duckhouse, 1966 c g
Psychoda nigripennis Brunetti, 1908 c g
Psychoda nigriventris Tokunaga, 1958 c g
Psychoda nolana Quate & Quate, 1967 c g
Psychoda notata (Blanchard, 1852) c g
Psychoda notatipennis Brunetti, 1913 c g
Psychoda novaezealandica Satchell, 1950 c g
Psychoda nugatrix Baez, 1991 c g
Psychoda nya Quate, 1962 c g
Psychoda obeliske Quate, 1996 c g
Psychoda obscuripennis Jezek, 2005 c g
Psychoda occulta Quate & Quate, 1967 c g
Psychoda ocellata Quate, 1962 c g
Psychoda ochra Quate, 1959 c g
Psychoda oculifera Quate & Quate, 1967 c g
Psychoda orbicularis Brunetti, 1911 c g
Psychoda orientalis Wagner, 1978 c g
Psychoda pacilens Quate & Quate, 1967 c g
Psychoda pala Quate & Quate, 1967 c g
Psychoda pallens (Williston, 1896) c g
Psychoda paraderces Quate, 1962 c g
Psychoda paraguadens Quate & Quate, 1967 c g
Psychoda paraloba Quate & Quate, 1967 c g
Psychoda parsivena Quate, 1959 c g
Psychoda parthenogenetica Tonnoir, 1940 c g
Psychoda pellucida Quate, 1962 c g
Psychoda penicillata Satchell, 1950 c g
Psychoda perlonga Satchell, 1955 c g
Psychoda phalaenoides (Linnaeus, 1758, 1758) i c g
Psychoda phalanga Quate, 1965 c g
Psychoda phratra Quate, 1996 c g
Psychoda pinguicula Quate & Quate, 1967 c g
Psychoda pitilla Quate, 1996 c g
Psychoda plaesia Quate, 1959 c g
Psychoda platalea Quate, 1965 c g
Psychoda platilobata Tokunaga, 1957 c g
Psychoda plumbea Ibanez-Bernal, 1991 c g
Psychoda plumosa Tonnoir, 1939 c g
Psychoda plutea Quate & Quate, 1967 c g
Psychoda pontina Sara, 1953 c g
Psychoda prolarta Quate, 1965 c g
Psychoda pseudalternata Williams, 1946 i c g
Psychoda pseudobrevicornis Tokunaga, 1957 c g
Psychoda pseudocompar Tonnoir, 1929 c g
Psychoda pseudomaxima Tonnoir, 1939 c g
Psychoda pseudominuta Wagner, 1978 c g
Psychoda psilotes Quate, 1996 c g
Psychoda puertoricana Wagner & Masteller, 1996 c g
Psychoda pulchrima Satchell, 1954 c g
Psychoda pulla (Rondani, 1863) c g
Psychoda punctaella (Townsend, 1897) c g
Psychoda pusilla Tonnoir, 1922 i c g
Psychoda quadrata Quate & Quate, 1967 c g
Psychoda quadricornis Quate & Quate, 1967 c g
Psychoda quadrifilis Edwards, 1928 c g
Psychoda quadrilosa Quate & Quate, 1967 c g
Psychoda quadropsis Quate & Quate, 1967 c g
Psychoda quasisetigera Ibanez-Bernal, 2008 c g
Psychoda quatei Sara & Salamanna, 1967 c g
Psychoda quiniversa Quate, 1996 c g
Psychoda reducta Tonnoir, 1939 c g
Psychoda reevesi Quate, 2000 c g
Psychoda remata Quate & Quate, 1967 c g
Psychoda rhinocera Quate & Quate, 1967 c g
Psychoda rhipsalis Quate & Quate, 1967 c g
Psychoda rhis Quate, 1996 c g
Psychoda rosetta Quate & Quate, 1967 c g
Psychoda rujumensis Jezek, 2005 c g
Psychoda saites Quate, 1965 c g
Psychoda salicornia Quate, 1954 i c g
Psychoda sanfilippoi Salamanna, 1980 c g
Psychoda sarcophila Vaillant, 1988 c g
Psychoda satchelli Quate, 1955 i c g
Psychoda savaiensis Edwards, 1928 c g
Psychoda savaiiensis Edwards, 1928 i c
Psychoda scotina Quate, 1959 c g
Psychoda scuticopenis Satchell, 1955 c g
Psychoda sectiga Quate & Quate, 1967 c g
Psychoda selangoriana Satchell, 1958 c g
Psychoda semberica Krek, 1979 c g
Psychoda septempunctata (Philippi, 1865) c g
Psychoda serpentina Quate, 1965 c g
Psychoda serraorobonensis Bravo, Cordeiro & Chagas g
Psychoda serraorobonsis Bravo, Cordeiro & Chagas, 2006 c g
Psychoda serrata Wagner, 1989 c g
Psychoda setigera Tonnoir, 1922 i c g
Psychoda setistyla Satchell, 1950 c g
Psychoda sibilica Quate & Quate, 1967 c g
Psychoda sigma Kincaid, 1899 i c g
Psychoda simillima Tonnoir, 1929 c g
Psychoda simplex Satchell, 1954 c g
Psychoda sinuosa Wagner, 1978 c g
Psychoda solangensis Kaul, 1971 c g
Psychoda solitaria Eaton, 1913 c g
Psychoda solivaga Duckhouse, 1971 c g
Psychoda spectabilis Quate & Quate, 1967 c g
Psychoda sphelata Quate & Quate, 1967 c g
Psychoda spicula Quate & Quate, 1967 c g
Psychoda spinacia Quate & Quate, 1967 c g
Psychoda spinipelata Quate & Quate, 1967 c g
Psychoda spondea Quate, 1996 c g
Psychoda squamata Satchell, 1953 c g
Psychoda squamipleuris Satchell, 1953 c g
Psychoda squamulata Satchell, 1950 c g
Psychoda stenostypis Quate, 1996 c g
Psychoda subinflata Satchell, 1955 c g
Psychoda subpennata Satchell, 1953 c g
Psychoda subquadrilobata Tokunaga, 1957 c g
Psychoda surcoufi Tonnoir, 1922 c g
Psychoda symmetrica Vaillant, 1973 i c g
Psychoda talamanca Quate, 1996 c g
Psychoda tenella (Philippi, 1865) c g
Psychoda terlinoculata Quate, 1965 c g
Psychoda terskolina Vaillant & Joost, 1983 c g
Psychoda thrinax Quate, 1955 i c g
Psychoda tiencensis Wagner, 2003 c g
Psychoda torquata Quate, 1962 c g
Psychoda tothastica Quate, 1955 i c g
Psychoda transversa Brunetti, 1911 c g
Psychoda triaciculata Satchell, 1950 c g
Psychoda tridens Satchell, 1954 c g
Psychoda tridentata Sara et Salamanna, 1967 c g
Psychoda trifida Wagner, 1979 c g
Psychoda trilobata Tokunaga, 1958 c g
Psychoda trinodulosa Tonnoir, 1922 i c g
Psychoda truncata Satchell, 1953 c g
Psychoda trunculens Quate, 1965 c g
Psychoda tumorosa Quate & Quate, 1967 c g
Psychoda turgida Quate, 1965 c g
Psychoda umbracola Quate, 1955 i c g
Psychoda umbractica Quate, 1965 c g
Psychoda uncinula Quate, 1954 c g
Psychoda undulata Tonnoir, 1939 c g
Psychoda uncinula Quate, 1954 i g
Psychoda uniformata Haseman, 1907 i c g
Psychoda unioculata Quate, 1965 c g
Psychoda usitata Quate, 1963 c g
Psychoda vagabunda Quate, 1962 c g
Psychoda vaillanti Sara et Salamanna, 1967 c g
Psychoda vanga Quate, 1962 c g
Psychoda varablanca Quate, 1996 c g
Psychoda velita Ibanez-Bernal, 1993 c g
Psychoda venusta (Weyenbergh, 1886) c g
Psychoda vesca Quate & Quate, 1967 c g
Psychoda villosa Salamanna & Raggio, 1985 c g
Psychoda virgo Vaillant, 1988 g
Psychoda vittata Brunetti, 1908 c g
Psychoda wattsi Duckhouse, 1966 c g
Psychoda williamsi Quate, 1954 i c g
Psychoda wilsoni Quate & Quate, 1967 c g
Psychoda wirthi Quate, 1954 i c g
Psychoda yapensis Quate, 1959 c g
Psychoda ypsylon Satchell, 1953 c g
Psychoda zetoscotia Quate, 1959 c g
Psychoda zigzagensis Rosario, 1936 c g
Psychoda zonata Satchell, 1950 c g

Data sources: i = ITIS, c = Catalogue of Life, g = GBIF, b = Bugguide.net

References

Psychoda
Articles created by Qbugbot